"If Teardrops Were Silver" is a single by American country music artist Jean Shepard.  Released in June 1966, it was released on the album, Heart, We Did All We Could.  The song reached #10 on the Billboard Hot Country Singles chart.

Chart performance

References 

1966 singles
Jean Shepard songs
Song recordings produced by Ken Nelson (American record producer)
1966 songs
Capitol Records singles
Songs written by Don Wayne (songwriter)